Tulpa is a 2012 Italian giallo-horror film directed by Federico Zampaglione. It premiered at the 2012 London FrightFest Film Festival and was released in Italy on June 20, 2013.

Plot 
Lisa Boeri is a business woman with a secret double life: if during the day she is a busy and serious worker, the night she is an assiduous frequenter of the private club Tulpa, owned by a haunting Tibetan guru, where the sickest fantasies of customers become reality. But the fiery lovers who attended Lisa begin to die one by one in increasingly cruel ways, and the woman finds herself involved in the chain of murders. Forced to investigate on her own, not to discover her double life to the police, she will face a terrible escalation of death, mystery and eroticism.

Cast 
 Claudia Gerini: Lisa Boeri
 Michela Cescon: Giovanna
 Nuot Arquint: Kiran
 Michele Placido: Roccaforte
 Ennio Tozzi: Ferri
 Ivan Franek: Stefan
 Crisula Stafida: Giulia

Reception 
The film received generally positive reviews by Italian film critics. It was referred as "more than a tribute to the masters of the genre of the Seventies", "an attempt to resurrect an imaginary, a disenchanted and passionate way of making films". Film critic Natalino Bruzzone wrote: "Tulpa has defects and failures, but its constant, uncertain balance between suspense, frightening visual style, grotesque and liberating sense of the absurd make it interesting".

References

External links

2012 films
English-language Italian films
Giallo films
2010s thriller films
Italian horror films
2010s English-language films